Ramarao Indira (born 22 April 1952 in Mysore, Karnataka) is an Indian sociologist who lives in Mysore. In her University career spanning 42 years, she has held such positions as Chair of the Department of Sociology, Director of the International Centre and Honorary Director of the Centre for Women's Studies at the University of Mysore.

Academic and Professional Career 
Indira had her school and college education in Mysore and joined the University of Mysore as a faculty in the Department of Sociology in 1972 and continued to teach and engage in research in the Department until her superannuation in the year 2014. She built a research culture in the department through her people-centric research projects and also through training students to undertake studies on themes of social relevance. She is well known for her works on gender issues in forest management, girls’ education, building capacities of women in institutions of local self-governance. A columnist who has been writing on social themes in leading Kannada newspapers, her major works include Themes in Sociology of Education (Studies in Indian Sociology) and Gender and Society in India (two volumes) as editor, and many Kannada books on such themes as feminism, women and culture, and research methods. Consulting Editor, 'Sociology' -  English -Kannada Translation Equivalents. Chief Editor, 'Gender and Women's Studies'- English - Kannada Translation Equivalents. She is a contributor to and editor of encyclopaedias, dictionaries, journals, theme-based books and translation projects.

Research and Teaching 

Indira is an Honorary Adjunct Professor at the University of Iowa. She also taught a semester at that University as a Fulbright Visiting Lecturer. Earlier she had worked on American Women & Technical Education on a Fulbright Post-Doctoral Fellowship at Purdue University, West Lafayette, Indiana. She was an ICSSR Senior Research Fellow & received four fellowships from the Shastri Indo Canadian Institute and has carried out extensive work with forest communities in Western Ghats. Indira has been a visiting faculty at Study India Programs of the Universities of Puget Sound, Iowa, Delaware, Princeton, Michigan  and Florida International University in the United States and Mount Alison, Guelph and Concordia Universities in Canada. She has been Visiting Fellow at the University of Delhi and Sri Venkateswara University, Tirupati and Scholar-in-Residence at the Kuvempu and Bangalore Universities. 

Current responsibilities

She is the President of Samruddhi Foundation, a civil society group that she initiated with her family & friends for building the capacities of women, research students and members of society.  

Indira is currently heading a team that is translating Anthony Giddens’ Sociology into Kannada, besides being involved in translation projects and evaluation of forestry programmes in Karnataka. She was Secretary of the Indian Sociological Society between 2014 and 2015, and is currently the Honorary President, Alumni Association, Department of Sociology, Masagangotri, University of Mysore, Mysuru.

See also
Jayalakshmi Seethapura
Nanjaiah Honganuru
Aravinda Malagatti
Vijaya Dabbe
C. P. Siddhashrama

References

External links
 
 University of Mysore page

Indian sociologists
Indian feminists
University of Mysore alumni
1952 births
Living people
Indian women sociologists
Academic staff of the University of Mysore
Scientists from Karnataka
20th-century Indian women writers
20th-century Indian non-fiction writers
20th-century Indian women scientists
20th-century Indian social scientists
20th-century Indian educational theorists
Indian women educational theorists
Women writers from Karnataka
Scholars from Mysore
Women scientists from Karnataka
21st-century Indian social scientists
Women educators from Karnataka
Educators from Karnataka
21st-century Indian women writers
20th-century women educators